Manakanakku is a 1986 Indian Tamil-language film directed by R. C. Sakthi, starring Vijayakanth, Sarath Babu, Rajesh, Ambika and Radha. Kamal Haasan acted in a guest appearance. This was the only film where Haasan and Vijayakanth appeared onscreen together. The film was released on 28 February 1986.

Plot

Cast 
Vijayakanth as Ramanu
Radha as Lakshmi
Rajesh as Pandiyan
Sarath Babu as Lakshmi's husband
Malashri as actress
Senthamarai (actor) as Ambalam
Ambika as Kalyani
Baby Sujitha as Murali
MLA Thangaraj
'Rocket' Ramanathan
Kamal Haasan as Film director (Guest appearance)

Soundtrack 
The music was composed by M. S. Viswanathan.

Reception 
Jayamanmadhan of Kalki wrote Manakanakku is a crowning achievement for director R. C. Sakthi who weaved a dense story neatly.

References

External links 
 

1986 films
1980s Tamil-language films
Films scored by M. S. Viswanathan
Films directed by R. C. Sakthi